Federal Route 90, or Jalan Desaru and Jalan Teluk Ramunia, is a federal road in Johor, Malaysia. It connects Pengerang Highway, route 92 to Desaru. 4.9 km of this route is for Jalan Desaru

Route background
The Kilometre Zero of the Federal Route 90 starts at Bulatan Desaru roundabout near Desaru.

Features
 RAPID Pengerang Petrochemical Complex, the largest petrochemical plant in southern Peninsula Malaysia

At most sections, the Federal Route 90 was built under the JKR R5 road standard, allowing maximum speed limit of up to 90 km/h.

List of junctions

Jalan Desaru

Jalan Teluk Ramunia

References

090